Freddie Read (born 27 October 2000) is an English footballer who plays college soccer as a midfielder for Georgia State University.

Early life
Freddie is the son of Mark and Justine Read. Has two siblings, Theo and Bennie. Freddie attended S.t Johns College in Southsea.

Club career

Portsmouth
He made his Portsmouth first-team debut on 4 December 2018 starting in a 2–1 win against Arsenal U21s in the Checkatrade Trophy.

Career statistics

References

External links
 Freddie Read at Georgia State Athletics

2000 births
Living people
English footballers
Association football midfielders
Portsmouth F.C. players
Georgia State Panthers men's soccer players